Symphony No. 4 ("Heroes") is a symphony composed by American composer Philip Glass in 1996 based on the album "Heroes" by David Bowie. Glass had based his earlier Symphony No. 1 on the David Bowie album Low.

Symphony
The symphony is scored for 2 flutes, piccolo, 2 oboes, 2 clarinets, bass clarinet, 2 bassoons, 3 horns, 3 trumpets, 2 trombones, bass trombone, tuba, percussion, harp, piano, celesta and strings.

The symphony is in six movements:

"Abdulmajid", the David Bowie song on which the second movement was based, was not included on the original release of Heroes, but was recorded around the Heroes recording sessions. The song would later be released on the Rykodisc reissue of the album in 1991.

Album

The album "Heroes" Symphony includes only the "Heroes" Symphony performed by American Composers Orchestra directed by Michael Riesman and conducted by Dennis Russell Davies. Recorded and distributed by POINT Music record label, a joint venture of Euphorbia Productions Ltd and Philips Classics Productions, catalog number 454-388-2.

Track listing 
 "Heroes" (5:53)
 Abdulmajid (8:53)
 Sense of Doubt (7:20)
 Sons of the Silent Age (8:18)
 Neuköln (6:41)
 V2 Schneider (6:48)

References

External links
Programme note by the composer, Chester Novello

 04
Philip Glass albums
1996 compositions
Glass 04